Carolyn Mary Kleefeld (née Taper) is an English-American author, poet, and visual artist. She is the author of twenty-five books, has a line of fine art cards, and has had numerous gallery and museum awards and exhibitions between 1981 and the present, in New York City, Chicago, Los Angeles, San Francisco, and other major cities.

Biography

Early life
Kleefeld was born in Catford, South London, the youngest daughter of Amelia (née Lewis) and Mark Taper. Her family was Jewish. At the age of four, she moved to Long Beach and then Santa Monica, California. She attended the Westlake School for Girls. She studied art and psychology at UCLA.

Career
Kleefeld is the author of twenty-five books. She has created an extensive and diverse body of paintings and drawings, ranging in style from romantic figurative to abstract. Her art is featured internationally in galleries, museums, private collections, and multimedia presentations.

Personal life
Kleefeld currently lives in Big Sur, California. Kleefeld is also known by her married name, Caroyln Campagna Kleefeld. On Valentine’s Day 2017, she wed David Campagna. Campagna died three weeks later from a long-term illness. She had previously been married to Tony Kleefeld, known professionally as Tony Travis.

Poetry and writings 

Kleefeld's writings include poetry, prose, and art. Her work has been translated into Korean, Romanian, Japanese, Italian, Sicilian, Chinese, Arabic, Bengali, Bulgarian, Russian, Spanish, Catalan, Greek, and Persian.

Artwork
Kleefeld’s artwork has appeared in numerous galleries and museums.

The Frederick R. Weisman Art Museum at Pepperdine University in Malibu, California, exhibited a retrospective of her paintings and drawings and published an exhibition catalog, Carolyn Mary Kleefeld: Visions from Big Sur, with art from the exhibit and a commentary by museum curator and director, Michael Zakian.

Other solo exhibitions include “30 years of Abstract Visions” at the Gallery at the Ventana Inn in Big Sur, California (2014), “The Divine Kiss” at the Karpeles Manuscript Library Museum in Santa Barbara, California (2013) and Shreveport, Louisiana (2014), “Art, Poetry, and Reflective Prose”at the Walter Lee Avery Gallery at the Seaside, California City Hall (2002), “Parallel Universes: Visions for the 21st Century” at the Stowitts Museum & Library in Pacific Grove, California (2001), “A Retrospective from Abstract to Neo-Impressionism” at the corporate offices of “333 Bush Street,” in San Francisco, California (1999), and a poetry reading and art exhibit at Gallerie Illuminati in Santa Monica, California (1990). Kleefeld's art has also been exhibited at The American Jewish University, Los Angeles (2016), The B.J. Spoke Gallery, Huntington, New York (2014), The Old Courthouse Art Center, Woodstock, Illinois (2014), The New York Hall of Science, New York, NY (2013), the Alexandria Museum of Art, Alexandria, Louisiana (2013), Woman Made Gallery, Chicago, Illinois (2001), University of California-Santa Cruz, Santa Cruz, California (2001), National Arts Club in New York, New York (2001), and Nassau County Museum of Art, Roslyn Harbor, New York, among others.

Kleefeld’s art is in the permanent collections, among others, of The Downey Museum of Art, The Frederick R. Weisman Art Museum, The Henry Miller Memorial Library in Big Sur, and The Dylan Thomas Theatre, in Swansea, Wales.

Carolyn Campagna Kleefeld Contemporary Art Museum
In 2019, Kleefeld gifted $10 million to the California State University, Long Beach (CSULB), which was by far the largest donation received by the school. Consequently, the University Art Museum was renamed the Carolyn Campagna Kleefeld Contemporary Art Museum later that year.  Months later, Kleefeld donated 120 of her own artworks to the institution’s permanent collection.

After undergoing a two-year-long expansion and renovation, the museum re-opened on February 12, 2022, and now holds 178 of Kleefeld's drawings and paintings as part of its permanent collection. In addition, the University houses Kleefeld's literary archives, and an endowment will fund annual scholarships for the College of the Arts, an interdisciplinary lecture series at the university, a student intern, and museum program enhancement. 

After the opening of the Kleefeld exhibit at CSULB, Los Angeles Times art critic Christopher Knight described Kleefeld's work as "frankly terrible - by far the worst I’ve seen on display in a serious exhibition venue, public or private, for profit or nonprofit, in years." An anonymous professor at the university also noted: “If that was a student applicant’s portfolio, they wouldn’t get admitted to the program."

Awards and honors

Nominations for The Pushcart Prize, 2008, 2009, 2011, 2012, 2013, 2014
World Poetry Empowered Poet Award / Vancouver, Canada, 2014
Il Meleto Di Guido Gozanno Award for Poetry / Torino, Italy, 2014
First place, Short Story Contest: 101 Words / Monterey County Weekly / Monterey, CA, 2006
First Place, Light, Space & Time Art Competition: Abstraction, Judge’s Award for Excellence, John Nichols Gallery, Santa Paula, CA, 2001

Bibliography
Poetry
Climates of the Mind (1979) (5th Reprint: Author's Choice Press: Lincoln, NE (2005) 
Satan Sleeps With The Holy: Word Paintings (1982) Horse and Bird Press; Big Sur, CA 
Lovers in Evolution (1983) Editor: Patricia Karahan. Horse and Bird Press: Big Sur, CA 
Vagabond Dawns (2009) Cross-Cultural Communications, New York 
Poet to Poet #4: Poems--East Coast/West Coast with Stanley Barkan (2010) The Seventh Quarry/Cross Cultural Communications, 

Poetry and Art
Kissing Darkness: Love Poems and Art with David Wayne Dunn (2003) RiverWood Books 
The Divine Kiss: An Exhibit of Paintings and Poems in Honor of David Campagna (2014) Cross-Cultural Communications, New York 
Immortal Seeds: Bearing Gold from the Abyss (2022) Cross-Cultural Communications/The Seventh Quarry Press 

Poetry, Prose, and Art
Songs of Ecstasy (1990) Gallerie Illuminati:Santa Monica, CA 
The Alchemy of Possibility: Reinventing Your Personal Mythology (1998) Merrill West 
Soul Seeds: Revelations and Drawings (2008) Cross Cultural Communications, New York    
Psyche of Mirrors: A Promenade of Portraits (2012) Cross-Cultural Communications, New York 

Art
Carolyn Mary Kleefeld: Visions from Big Sur by Michael Zakian (2008) The Frederick R Weisman of Art, Pepperdine University 

Translated Collections
Vagabond Dawns (Korean/English bilingual edition) Translated by Irene Seonjoo Yoon (2012) Korean Expatriate Literature/Cross-Cultural Communications, 
Zori Hoinari - Vagabond Dawns (Romanian/English bilingual edition) Translated by Dr. Olimpia Iacob (2013) Limes Publishing, 
Soul Seeds: Revelations and Drawings (Korean/English bilingual edition) Translated by Dr. Byoung K. Park (2014) Korean Expatriate Literature/Cross-Cultural Communications, ISBN Korean 978-11-85238-12-8, ISBN American 978-0-89304-996-6
Soul Seeds Revelations and Drawings (Japanese/English bilingual edition) Translated by Naoshi Koriyama (2014) Coal Sack Publishing Company/Cross-Cultural Communications, ISBN Japanese 978-4-86435-174-4, ISBN American 978-0-89304-932-4
Soul Seeds: Revelations and Drawings (Sicilian/Italian/English trilingual edition) Translated by Gaetano Cipolla, (2014) Legas Publishing, 
The Divine Kiss/In the Flames of Dandelions (Sărut Divin/În Flăcările Păpădilor) with Ioan Nistor, (Bilingual Romanian/English) All poems translated by Dr. Olimpia Iacob, (2014) Limes Publishing, 
The Divine Kiss: An Exhibit of Paintings and Poems in Honor of David Campagna (Japanese/English bilingual edition) Translated by Naoshi Koriyama (2017) Coal Sack Publishing/Cross-Cultural Communications   (Japanese),   (American)
The Divine Kiss: An Exhibit of Paintings and Poems in Honor of David Campagna (Greek/English bilingual edition) Translated by Manolis Aligizakis (2018) Libros Libertad Publishing, Ltd/Cross-Cultural Communications  (Canadian),   (American)
The Divine Kiss: An Exhibit of Paintings and Poems in Honor of David Campagna (Sicilian/Italian/English trilingual edition) Translated by Marco Scalabrino and Gaetano Cipolla (2018) Legas/Cross-Cultural Communications

References

Further reading 
 Ryan Masters. "Big Sur’s Carolyn Mary Kleefeld expands her churning catalog of poetry and art with Vagabond Dawns",  Monterey County Weekly, November 2009 
 Jonathan Weichsel. "Visions from Big Sur", Valley Scene Online Magazine, 2008 
 Nichole Kleist. "Pepperdine Museum Hosts Former Malibu Resident’s Colorful Work",  Malibu Surfside News, September 2008
 Stephanie Pope. " A Poetic Eye; A Life Cherishing Force: The Alchemy of Possibility"  ,"SkyLine Magazine", June 2007
 "Carolyn Mary Kleefeld: Colorful as her art", Monterey County Herald, September 8, 2002 - E3 Brunch Entertainment.

External links
 
 Carolyn Campagna Kleefeld Contemporary Art Museum

Living people
American artists
American people of English-Jewish descent
American people of Polish-Jewish descent
Artists from Santa Monica, California
English emigrants to the United States
English people of Polish-Jewish descent
Harvard-Westlake School alumni
People from Catford
People from Long Beach, California
University of California, Los Angeles alumni
Date of birth missing (living people)
Year of birth missing (living people)
American women artists